Yakov Ivanovich Alksnis (– 28 July 1938) was a Soviet military leader and the commander of the Red Army Air Forces from 1931 to 1937.

Biography
Jēkabs Alksnis was born in a farmer's family in Naukšēni Parish, Governorate of Livonia, Russian Empire (present-day Latvia). He attended school in Rāmnieki (1907–1913) and a teachers' seminary (college) in Valmiera (1913–1917), where he joined the Bolshevik Party in 1916. In 1917 Alksnis was drafted into the Imperial Russian Army; he completed basic officers' training in Odessa, and was assigned to the 15th Siberian Regiment, later the 11th Siberian Regiment. After the Treaty of Brest-Litovsk he left the Russian Army. He was drafted again, this time to the Red Army, in 1919, and in 1919–1921 held administrative and political assignments in the Southern Russian theatre of war.

After graduation from the Red Army Military Academy (1921–1924) Alksnis was appointed the head of the logistics service of the Red Air Forces; in 1926 the deputy commander of the Red Air Forces. In 1929 he received the wings of a fighter pilot at the Kacha pilot's school in Crimea and was later known to fly nearly every day. Defector Alexander Barmine described Alksnis as "a strict disciplinarian with high standards of efficiency. He would himself personally inspect flying officers... not that he was fussy or took the slightest interest in smartness for its own sake, but, as he explained to me, flying demands constant attention to detail... Headstrong he may have been, but he was a man of method and brought a wholly new spirit into Soviet aviation. It is chiefly owing to him that the Air Force is the powerful weapon it is today." According to Barmine, Alksnis was instrumental in making parachute jumping a sport for the masses. He was influenced by one of his subordinates who had seen parachutists entertaining the public in the United States, at the time when Soviet pilots regarded parachutes as "almost a clinical instrument".

In the same year he was involved in establishing one of the first sharashkas – an aircraft design bureau staffed by prisoners of Butyrki prison, including Nikolai Polikarpov and Dmitry Grigorovich. In 1930–1931 the sharashka, now based on Khodynka Field, produced the prototype for the successful Polikarpov I-5. In June 1931 Alksnis was promoted to the Commander of Red Air Forces, while Polikarpov and some of his staff were released on amnesty terms. In 1935, the Red Air Forces under Alksnis possessed the world's largest bomber force; aircraft production reached 8,000 in 1936.

In June 1937 Alknis sat on the board of the show trial against members of Trotskyist Anti-Soviet Military Organization. During the Great Purge, as a part of the so-called "Latvian Operation", Alksnis was arrested by the NKVD on 23 November 1937, expelled from the Communist Party, charged with setting up a "Latvian fascist organization" and shot on 28 July 1938 at the Kommunarka shooting ground.

During the destalinization of the late 1950s, Alksnis was posthumously rehabilitated; the Air Forces college in Riga was named in his honour. Viktor Alksnis (born 1950), grandson of Yakov Alksnis, is a right-wing Russian politician remembered for his pro-Union activities of the late 1980s and early 1990s.

References

External links

1897 births
1938 deaths
People from Valmiera Municipality
People from Kreis Wolmar
Bolsheviks
Communist Party of the Soviet Union members
Latvian communists
Soviet Air Force officers
Imperial Russian Army officers
Frunze Military Academy alumni
Russian military personnel of World War I
Soviet military personnel of the Russian Civil War
Recipients of the Order of Lenin
Recipients of the Order of the Red Banner
Latvian Operation of the NKVD
Executed military personnel
Great Purge victims from Latvia
Members of the Communist Party of the Soviet Union executed by the Soviet Union
People executed by the Soviet Union by firearm
Soviet rehabilitations